Compy may refer to:

 An abbreviation, slang term or pet name for a computer
 The shortened form of Procompsognathus, as used in the book Jurassic Park
 Compy 386, a computer in the comedy web series Homestar Runner